The Windsor City Council is the governing body of Windsor, Ontario, Canada.

The council consists of the mayor plus ten elected city councillors (one per ward) representing the city as a whole.

2006-2010
Council elected in the 2006 election:

2010-2014
Council elected in the 2010 election:

2014-2018

2018-2022 
Council elected in the 2018 election:

2022-2026 
Council elected in the 2022 election:

References

External links
City of Windsor

Municipal councils in Ontario